=? may refer to:

 Symbol to indicate the start of encoding in a MIME encoded-word
 Operator in Fortran to output the NAMELIST to stdout
 ≟, undetermined equality, or 'questioned equal to'

See also 
 ?= (disambiguation)
 ?: